This article lists the squads for the 2014 Algarve Cup, the 21st edition of the Algarve Cup. The cup consisted of a series of friendly games, and was held in the Algarve region of Portugal from 5 to 12 March 2014. The twelve national teams involved in the tournament registered a squad of 23 players.

The age listed for each player is as of 5 March 2015, the first day of the tournament. The numbers of caps and goals listed for each player do not include any matches played after the start of tournament. The club listed is the club for which the player last played a competitive match prior to the tournament. The nationality for each club reflects the national association (not the league) to which the club is affiliated. A flag is included for coaches that are of a different nationality than their own national team.

Group A

China

Head coach: Hao Wei

Germany
The squad was announced on 24 February 2014. On 2 March 2014, Linda Bresonik withdrew due to injury and was replaced by Tabea Kemme.

Head coach: Silvia Neid

Iceland
The squad was announced on 24 February 2014.

Head coach: Freyr Alexandersson

Norway
The squad was announced on 19 February 2014.

Head coach: Even Pellerud

Group B

Denmark
The squad was announced on 14 February 2014.

Head coach: Nils Nielsen

Japan
The squad was announced on 17 February 2014.

Head coach: Norio Sasaki

Sweden
The squad was announced on 12 February 2014.

Head coach: Pia Sundhage

United States
The squad was announced on 24 February 2014.

Head Coach:  Tom Sermanni

Group C

Austria
The squad was announced on 24 February 2014.

Head coach: Dominik Thalhammer

North Korea

Head coach: Kim Kwang-min

Portugal
The squad was announced on 28 February 2014.

Head coach: Francisco Neto

Russia
The squad was announced on 25 February 2014.

Head coach: Sergei Lavrentyev

Player representation

By club
Clubs with 5 or more players represented are listed.

By club nationality

By club federation

By representatives of domestic league

References

External links

 

2014 squads
squad